is the professional name of , a Japanese writer.  They pride themselves on writing "things no one else can say in words anyone can understand". They have won the Bungei Prize and the Shimase Award for Love Stories.  They have been nominated multiple times for the Akutagawa Prize, and their work has been adapted for film. Nao-Cola has chosen not to make their gender public, and has stated that their pronoun is singular "they". They have two children.

Early life and education 
Yamazaki was born in 1978 in Kitakyushu, Japan. Shortly after their birth their family moved to Saitama Prefecture, where they were raised. Yamazaki started writing fiction as a senior at Kokugakuin University, from which they graduated after writing a thesis on the character Ukifune in The Tale of Genji. They chose the pen name "Nao-Cola" because they liked Diet Coke.

Career 
Hito no sekkusu o warau na won the 41st Bungei Prize, an award recognizing new writers. The book was also nominated for the 132nd Akutagawa Prize. Hito no sekkusu o warau na was later adapted into the 2008 Nami Iguchi film of the same name,  starring Hiromi Nagasaku and Kenichi Matsuyama.

Several of Yamazaki's subsequent novels were also nominated for the Akutagawa Prize. , Yamazaki's 2007 novel about the relationships among people who meet at a beauty salon, was nominated for the 138th Akutagawa Prize and survived the first round of voting by the selection committee, but ultimately did not win, as the prize went to Mieko Kawakami. Their story , later included in a 2009 collection of the same name, was nominated for the 140th Akutagawa Prize. , a romance novel about the relationship between a popular photographer and a photographer's assistant, was nominated for the 145th Akutagawa Prize. In 2016 their novel  was nominated for the 155th Akutagawa Prize, marking their fifth nomination for the award, but the award went to first-time nominee Sayaka Murata. Utsukushii kyori, a story about a married couple dealing with the wife's terminal cancer, subsequently won the 23rd Shimase Award for Love Stories.

In addition to their fiction, Yamazaki also publishes essays on non-traditional family life, including the 2016 collection , a series of essays about living in a family where the wife is more successful than the husband. After having their first child at the age of 37, Yamazaki wrote a series of essays about the first year of their child's life.  The resulting book, was published in 2017.

Yamazaki's first English-language book, a collection of short stories translated by Polly Barton, was published by Strangers Press under the title Friendship for Grown Ups in 2017. In a review for The Japan Society of the UK, Eluned Gramich noted that Yamazaki "seems more interested in the distance between lovers than in what unites them", but also called Friendship for Grown Ups "funny and clever". The Japan Times praised Yamazaki's "skill in evoking the ambiguity of contemporary life" and called the collection "a small book that says a lot about the way we live today".

Recognition 
 2004: 41st Bungei Prize
 2017: 23rd Shimase Award for Love Stories

Works

Selected works in Japanese 
 , Kawade Shobō Shinsha, 2004, 
 , Kawade Shobō Shinsha, 2007, 
 , Bungeishunjū, 2007, 
 , Kawade Shobō Shinsha, 2011, 
 , Chikuma Shobō, 2014, 
 , Natsuhasha, 2015, 
 , Bungeishunjū, 2016, 
 , Kawade Shobō Shinsha, 2017, 
 , Chūōkōron Shinsha, 2018, 
 , Kawade Shobō Shinsha, 2019, 
 , Seibundō Shinkōsha, 2019, 
 , Kawade Shobō Shinsha, 2019,

Selected works in English 
 "The Beginning of the Long End", trans. Takami Nieda, Asymptote Journal, 2013
 "Cavities and Kindness", trans. Kalau Almony, Words Without Borders, 2015
 "Dad, I Love You", trans. Morgan Giles, The Book of Tokyo: A City in Short Fiction, 2015
 "A False Genealogy", trans. Polly Barton, Catapult Magazine, 2015
 Friendship For Grown Ups, trans. Polly Barton, Strangers Press, 2017, 
 "Fossil Candy", trans. Polly Barton, The Arkansas International, 2017

References

External links 
 Nao-Cola Yamazaki on Twitter
 Nao-Cola Yamazaki on Instagram

1978 births
Living people
21st-century Japanese novelists
People from Kitakyushu
Kokugakuin University alumni
Non-binary novelists
Japanese LGBT novelists